Events in the year 2002 in Ukraine.

Incumbents 

 President: Leonid Kuchma
 Prime Minister: Anatoliy Kinakh (until 21 November), Viktor Yanukovych (from 21 November)

Events 

 27 July – A Ukrainian Air Force Sukhoi Su-27 piloted by Volodymyr Toponar and co-piloted by Yuriy Yegorov crashed during an aerobatics presentation at Sknyliv airfield near Lviv, killing 77 people and injured 543, 100 of whom were hospitalized, making it the deadliest air show accident in history.

Deaths 
 Nikolai Amosov, medical doctor (12 December)
 Valeriy Lobanovskyi, football player and manager (13 May)
 George Shevelov, linguist (12 April)

References 

 
Ukraine
Ukraine
2000s in Ukraine
Years of the 21st century in Ukraine